Food security refers to  ensuring adequate food supply to people, especially those who are deprived of basic nutrition. Food security has been a major concern in India. According to UNO -India, there are nearly 195 million undernourished people in India, which is a quarter of the world's hunger burden. Also, roughly 43% of children in India are chronically undernourished. India ranks 68 out of 113 major countries in terms of food security index 2022. Though the available nutritional standard is 100% of the requirement, India lags far behind in terms of quality protein intake at 20% which needs to be tackled by making available protein-rich food products such as soybeans, lentils, meat, eggs, dairy, etc. at affordable prices. The Human Rights Measurement Initiative finds that India is doing 56.8% of what should be possible at its level of income for the right to food.

Laws 
In order to provide the Right to food to every citizen of the country, the Parliament of India, enacted a legislation in 2013 known as the National Food Security Act, 2013. Also called as the Right to Food Act, this Act seeks to provide subsidized food grains to approximately two thirds of India's 1.33 billion population. It was signed into law on 10 September 2013, retroactive to 5 July 2013.

Schemes by government

Central Initiatives
The Food Corporation of India (FCI) was established in 1965 for the purpose of procurement, storage and distribution of foodgrains. It has been playing a major role in the food security of India.
The National Food Security Act,2013 (NFSA 2013) converts into legal entitlements for existing food security programmes of the Government of India. It also includes the Midday Meal Scheme, Integrated Child Development Services scheme and the Public Distribution System. In 2017-18, over Rs 1500 billion (7.6% of the government's total expenditure) have been allocated to provide food subsidies under the Targeted Public Distribution System (TPDS).
The NFSA 2013 also recognizes maternity entitlements. Pregnant women, lactating mothers, and certain categories of children are eligible for daily free cereals.

State Initiatives
Karnataka has launched the 'Indira Canteen', which serves breakfast, lunch, and dinner at a very low price. This idea was implemented by Siddaramaiah as CM so that no one in the state would go hungry and everyone would get healthy food.
Andhra Pradesh has supported the Nalabothu Foundation, which provides free meals to people in need by redistributing excess food from homes, restaurants, businesses, canteens, and gatherings. This scheme was brought to national attention by Prime Minister Modi.
Tamil Nadu has launched 'Amma Unavagam' (Mother's canteen), or more commonly known as Amma canteen. The genesis of this program could be traced to the scheme proposed by Nimbkar Agricultural Research Institute in 2012.
The State of UP in 2013 passed a food bill. Food that is going to be wasted from parties will be preserved and distributed to poor and needy people. 
The Chhattisgarh Food Security Act, 2012 law was enacted by the Chhattisgarh government. It was passed on 21 December 2012, by the State Assembly unopposed to ensure “access to adequate quantity of food and other requirements of good nutrition to the people of the State, at affordable prices, at all times to live a life of dignity.”
sugar)):5.00

Challenges for India
Food availability is not that reliable in India. The challenge to produce more and more for the growing population is becoming increasingly hard for a country of its size and economic growth. Since the land in India is a shrinking resource for agriculture, the production rate for agriculture needs to be higher per unit of land and irrigation water. Over 60% of the Indian population depend on agriculture for their daily meals. India produces around 100 million tonnes of rice every year. Accessing food in India can be considered to be more difficult than in Australia. While there might be enough food for the whole population of India, many families and especially children in India don't have access to food because of financial problems. Thus, this is the cause of millions of malnourished children around India. The cultural knowledge in India allows them to have a very nutritional and balanced diet. Nearly the whole of the Indian population has rice at least once a day which allows them to have carbohydrates in their system. Since India is most commonly known for producing and exporting rice to other countries, their lifestyle will be mainly dominated by rice.

Technological solutions
India needs to concentrate on methods to improve the availability and affordability of protein rich food products using the latest environmental friendly technology without the need of additional land and water. Biogas or natural gas or methane produced from farm/agro/crop/domestic waste can also be used in addition to mined natural gas for producing protein rich cattle/fish/poultry/pet animal feed economically by cultivating Methylococcus capsulatus bacteria culture in a decentralized manner near to the rural/consumption areas with tiny land and water foot print.

See also
 Bengal famine of 1943
 Green Revolution
 White revolution
 Public Distribution System
 National food security act, 2013
 Welfare schemes in India
 Antyodaya Anna Yojana

References

Further reading
Ramaswamy, S. (2017). Food Security in India. India: MJP Publishers.

External links
 https://ncert.nic.in/textbook/pdf/iess204.pdf
 Food Corporation of India- https://fci.gov.in/
 Antyodaya Anna Yojana- https://dfpd.gov.in/pds-aay.htm
 Integrated Child Development Services, All India- https://icds-wcd.nic.in
 Integrated Child Development Services, Tamil Nadu- https://icds.tn.nic.in/
 Academy of Development Science, Maharashtra- http://mahascience.org/

India
Health in India